Britling Cafeterias was a chain of cafeteria-style restaurants, originating in Birmingham, Alabama. During the late 1920s, Britling opened three cafeterias in downtown Birmingham, Alabama. The Britling chain in Memphis, along with B&W Cafeterias in Nashville, Tennessee and Blue Boar Cafeterias in Louisville, Kentucky, were under common ownership in their latter years. All have now closed.

History
Little information about the beginnings of the Birmingham company is publicly available, except that it was owned by John H. Holcomb of Birmingham.  Originally the Birmingham and Memphis cafeterias were one company, but in about 1930 the original Birmingham cafeteria was taken over by First National Bank due to financial hardship, with Holcomb buying the Birmingham operation from the bank. They agreed that the Britling name be continued in both locations.

In their heyday, the Britling cafeterias were local institutions in Birmingham and Memphis, particularly the earlier downtown locations. The First Avenue North location in Birmingham was a popular gathering spot in the late 1940s and 1950s, even featuring live music. The Twentieth St. North location featured seating in a balcony overlooking the main floor, and also connected to the Third Avenue North cafeteria; the two downtown Memphis cafeterias were similar. After-church Sunday afternoon lunches at Britling's were a tradition in both cities.

One of the downtown Memphis locations is noteworthy not only as a local landmark of its era, but for one of its former employees: Gladys Presley, mother of rock and roll legend Elvis Presley. A display at Graceland memorializes the Britling Cafeteria and her work there.

Both chains fell into decline in the 1970s, as fast food restaurants became increasingly popular and widespread. In both cities, the Britling management tried to counter this trend by expanding into suburban locations, a move that was successful for a time. In Birmingham, the chain opened locations on Highland Avenue, in Mountain Brook, and in popular shopping centers such as Eastwood Mall, Western Hills Mall, Vestavia Hills Mall and Five Points West Shopping City. A location was also opened in Huntsville. These eventually became the only locations, as the three original downtown restaurants were closed by the end of the 1970s. The Memphis management tried the same diversification, with several locations in suburban shopping centers eventually replacing the downtown restaurants. As the two companies struggled against the competition, the remaining cafeterias were converted into all-you-can-eat buffets; this was done with at least three Memphis locations and the one remaining Birmingham-area store in Hoover in the 1980s. The measure was only successful in the short term, and two Birmingham Britlings finally closed or sold off their Birmingham and Huntsville locations. The Hoover location was sold and became Battle Buffet, which itself closed in the early 1990s. There was also a Britling Cafeteria located at 221 W. 1st street (Park Ave.) Oklahoma City, OK, which also utilized the multilevel balcony seating format. This location, opening in December 1932, operated through the late 1940s to the early 1950s although the exact dates are unknown. The building that housed the Britling was demolished as a result of Oklahoma City's failed urban renewal program in the early 1960s.

References
 Zuber, Amy (February 1996) "William & Samuel Childs - pioneer cafeteria operators." Nation's Restaurant News
 Hollis, Tim (March 18, 2010) "Britling Cafeterias were part of Birmingham's dining landscape for years." Birmingham magazine

Restaurants in Alabama
Restaurants in Tennessee
Cafeteria-style restaurants
Companies based in Memphis, Tennessee
Regional restaurant chains in the United States
Defunct restaurant chains in the United States